Stephen Chandler may refer to:

 Stephen Sanders Chandler Jr. (1899–1989), American judge
 Stephen E. Chandler (1841–1919), American Civil War soldier and Medal of Honor recipient